Ara-Altsagat is a rural locality (an ulus) in Kyakhtinsky District, Republic of Buryatia, Russia. The population was 330 as of 2010. There are 5 streets.

Geography 
Ara-Altsagat is located 93 km southeast of Kyakhta (the district's administrative centre) by road. Pervomayskoye is the nearest rural locality.

References 

Rural localities in Kyakhtinsky District